The Kingdom of Luba or Luba Empire (1585–1889) was a pre-colonial Central African state that arose in the marshy grasslands of the Upemba Depression in what is now southern Congo.

muLopwe = Kings/emperors

See also
Congo
Congo, Democratic Republic of the
Presidents of the Democratic Republic of the Congo
Heads of government of the Democratic Republic of the Congo
Heads of state of the Congo Free State
Colonial heads of Congo
Rulers of Katanga
Rulers of Kuba
Rulers of Ruund (Luunda)
Rulers of Kasongo Luunda (Yaka)
Rulers of Kongo
Congo, Republic of the
Presidents of the Republic of the Congo
Lists of office-holders

Luba